Carlton Club is a cricket club in Barbados, competing in the Barbados Cricket Association Division 1 championship. The club is based in Black Rock, north of Bridgetown and its home ground is the Desmond Haynes Oval.  Carlton was founded on 1 April 1940 as a club for "lower middle income whites and near whites for whom there was no space in Pickwick and Wanderers [cricket clubs]". Changes in Barbadian society meant that from the 1960s onwards, the membership of Carlton gradually came to reflect the general Barbadian population.

A multi-sport club, Carlton also supports football, netball and volleyball teams. The club motto is Labor omnia vincit.

Notable cricketers from Carlton include:
Tony Cozier. 
Desmond Haynes, the club president in the 2000s.
Corey Collymore. 
Dale Richards.

Notes

References

External links
Official website

Cricket teams in Barbados
1940 establishments in Barbados
Cricket clubs established in 1940